The Yellow Star: The Persecution of the Jews in Europe 1933–45 is a 1980 West German documentary film directed by . Producers  and Arthur Cohn were nominated for the 1981 Academy Award for Best Documentary Feature.

References

External links

1980 films
1980 documentary films
West German films
1980s German-language films
German documentary films
German black-and-white films
Documentary films about antisemitism
Documentary films about Nazi Germany
Documentary films about the Holocaust
1980s German films